Lago Ranco is a Chilean place name that may refer to:
 Ranco Lake Chile's third largest lake by surface area
 Lago Ranco, Chile a city and municipality in Chile in the lakeside of Ranco Lake  

es:Ranco
it:Lago Ranco